Bensimon Byrne is an advertising agency based in Toronto, Canada.

History 
The company was founded by Jack Bensimon, presumably in partnership with someone whose surname is Byrne.

From 2000-2005, the company reinstated the I Am Canadian slogan for beer brewer company Molson Canadian, a slogan which had been discontinued the year before by agency MacLaren McCann.

The company oversaw Justin Trudeau's successful 2015 Canadian federal election campaign. Prior to this, the company had worked on other Canadian Liberal Party campaigns, such as those for Kathleen Wynne, Paul Martin, and Dalton McGuinty.

, the company had 225 staff members. In 2017, the company (including its subsidiaries Narrative and OneMethod) moved its office into the Canadian Broadcasting Centre in Toronto, Canada.

References

Advertising agencies of Canada
Marketing companies of Canada
Organizations based in Toronto